Dybowo may refer to the following places:
Dybowo, Kuyavian-Pomeranian Voivodeship (north-central Poland)
Dybowo, Pomeranian Voivodeship (north Poland)
Dybowo, Ełk County in Warmian-Masurian Voivodeship (north Poland)
Dybowo, Mrągowo County in Warmian-Masurian Voivodeship (north Poland)
Dybowo, Olecko County in Warmian-Masurian Voivodeship (north Poland)
Dybowo, Szczytno County in Warmian-Masurian Voivodeship (north Poland)